Something Special is a blended Scotch whisky brand created in 1912 and belonging to the Pernod Ricard group. 

The brand was created by Hill Thompson and Co in 1912 and is a blend of 35 malts from the Speyside and Islay malts aged in American and European oak casks.

It is the most sold premium whisky in South America.

References 

Blended Scotch whisky
Pernod Ricard brands